Protected areas of Turkmenistan include nine nature reserves (zapovednik) and 13 sanctuaries (zakaznik) with a total area of 19,750 km2 or more than 4% of Turkmenistan's territory.

Nature reserves
Repetek Nature Reserve, in Lebap Province, East Karakum Desert, near Amu Darya. Created in 1927 for study and preservation of a sand-desert ecosystem. Area 346 km2.
Hazar Nature Reserve, on the south-east coast of the Caspian Sea, in Balkan Province. Area 2,690 km2.
Bathyz Nature Reserve, in Mary Province, between Kushka and Tejen rivers. Created in 1941 for the protection of the Badkhyz Plateau ecosystem. Area 877 km2.
Köpetdag Nature Reserve, in the central part of the Kopetdag Range (Ahal Province). Created in 1976 for the protection of indigenous flora and fauna. Area 497 km2.
Sünt-Hasardag Nature Reserve, in South-West Kopetdag (Balkan Province). Created in 1977 for the restoration and study of indigenous flora and fauna. Area 303 km2.
Gaplaňgyr Nature Reserve, at the border with Kazakhstan and Uzbekistan in the north-west (Daşoguz Province). Created in 1979 for the protection and restoration of indigenous flora and fauna of the Kaplkankyr Plateau and surrounding areas of Northern Turkmenistan. Area 2,822 km2.
Amyderýa Nature Reserve, in the north-east of Lebap Province on the Amu Darya. Created in 1982 with an area of 495 km2.
Köýtendag Nature Reserve (formerly Kugitang Nature Reserve), at the extreme east of the country, in the Köýtendag Range (Lebap Province). Created in 1986 with an area of 271.4 km2.
Bereketli Garagum Nature Reserve, created in 2013.

Sanctuaries
Chemenibit (Çemenebit Sanctuary) (within Bathyz Nature Reserve)
Kyzyldzhar (Gyzyljar Sanctuary) (Bathyz Nature Reserve)
Pulkhatyn (Pulhatyn Sanctuary) (Bathyz Nature Reserve)
Meana-Chaаcha (Mäne-Çäçe Sanctuary) (Köpetdag Nature Reserve)
Kurykhovdan (Guryhowdan Sanctuary) (Köpetdag Nature Reserve)
Syunt-Khasardag (Sünt-Hasardag Sanctuary) (Sünt-Hasardag Nature Reserve)
Sarykamysh (Sarygamyş Sanctuary) (on Sarygamyş Lake, in Gaplaňgyr Nature Reserve)
Shasenem (Şasenem Sanctuary) (near Sarygamyş Lake, in Gaplaňgyr Nature Reserve)
Kelif Sanctuary (south-east Lebap, within the Amyderýa Nature Reserve)
Khodzhabuzhybelent (Hojaburjybelent Sanctuary) (Köýtendag Nature Reserve)
Khodzhapil (Hojapil Sanctuary) (Köýtendag Nature Reserve)
Karlyuk (Garlyk Sanctuary)(Köýtendag Nature Reserve)
Hojagarawul Sanctuary (Köýtendag Nature Reserve)
Ogurchinskiy (Ogurjaly Sanctuary) (on Ogurchinskiy Island in the Caspian Sea, off the west coast of Balkan Province, part of Hazar Nature Reserve)

Total area of sanctuaries is 11,560 km2 (2.6% of Turkmenistan's territory).

References

Further reading
National Program for the Protection of the Environment, Ashgabat, 2002, pp. 149-151

External links
Map of nature reserves of Turkmenistan
 Turkmenistan Ministry of Nature Protection
 UNESCO World Heritage Site